Bambusa  funghomii is a species of Bambusa bamboo.

Distribution 

Bambusa funghomii is endemic to Henan province, Guangdong province, and Guangxi province of China.

References 

funghomii
Flora of Guangdong
Flora of Henan
Flora of Guangxi